Tunturi Super Sport is one of the latest models made by Tunturi. It replaced the old Tunturi Sport model. Engine used was air-cooled Puch VZ50 N4 with 1.5 HP. There was also 'street' version of Super Sport available known as Tunturi DX, differences being rectangular headlight and plastic panels under and behind the seat.

It was made 1977-1987 until Tunturi Tiger S replaced the model.

Technical information

engine: Puch VZ50N4
engine type: 2-stroke
displacement:	49 cm³
cylinder diameter:	38mm
compression ratio:	8,5:1
max power: 1,1 kW @ 5000 rpm
carburetor: Bing 85/11/101
fuel mix: 2,5%
fuel tank capacity: 6,5l
transmission: 4-speed
clutch: wet multiple-disk
voltage: 6v
ignition system: magneto
ignition advance: 2,0mm
spark plug:	Bosch W7AP
span: 0,5 mm
Measurements
length: 1850 mm
wheelbase: 1230 mm
clearance: 210 mm
front tire: 2,25 x 19
pressure: 2-2,25 bar
rear tire: 2,75 x 17
pressure: 2-2,25 bar

Super Sport
Standard motorcycles
Motorcycles introduced in 1977